Francis D'Britto (born 4 December 1942) is a Catholic priest, writer, and environmental activist from Vasai, Mumbai. He is the author of the Subodh Bible, a translation of the Bible to Marathi.

Biography 
Fr Francis D'Britto was born on 4 December 1942.

Francis D'Britto was awarded the Dnyanoba-Tukaram Puraskar for his literary work. The Catholic priest is the first to get the award that was constituted in 2007.

The author priest had in 2013 won the state's literary award for best translation.

In April 2014, he was honored with the Sahitya Akademi Award.

On 22 September 2019, Fr Francis D'britto was unanimously elected as the president of 93rd Akhil Bharatiya Marathi Sahitya Sammelan (literary meet), to be held in Osmanabad on 10 January 2020.

References 

Living people
Indian environmentalists
20th-century Indian Roman Catholic priests
Indian male writers
1942 births
21st-century Indian Roman Catholic priests